Beautiful Soul is the third and final studio album by Cynthia Layne. The album was recorded and released in 2007, after Layne had taken a three-year hiatus from her career as a solo artist. Beautiful Soul was the last studio solo album released during Layne's lifetime.

Track listing
"Be You" - 3:43
"Kings & Queens" - 4:47
"Letting You Go" - 3:42
"Pimp Talk" - 4:41
"I Can't Change You" - 4:05
"Will U Be There" - 7:05
"All I Need" - 3:39
"Beautiful Soul" - 4:54
"Free Yourself" - 5:13
"Funny" - 6:01
"Mystery" - 5:42
"We" - 5:01
"Two and One" - 4:52
"Letting You Go (Extended Play)" - 5:27
"Nina Shouts" - 0:47

Personnel
Credits are adapted from the album's liner notes.

 Cynthia Layne - lead vocals, backing vocals
 Gary Mielke - bass guitar, keyboards, drum programming 
 Kenny Phelps - drums, percussion
 Joe "Coo Coo Bird" Kelsey - acoustic and electric bass guitars
 Rob Dixon - keyboards, alto, soprano, and tenor saxophones
 Richard Dole - trombone 
 P.J. Yinger - trombone

References

2007 albums